Kambo is a village in the municipality of Moss, in Østfold county, Norway.

Kambo Station, the local railway station, is served by commuter train line L21 between Skøyen (via Oslo) and Moss.

See also
List of villages in Østfold

References

External links
Moss kommune

Villages in Østfold